Chocolate box art originally referred literally to decorations on chocolate boxes. Over the years, however, the terminology has changed; it is now applied broadly as an often pejorative term to describe paintings and designs that are overly idealistic and sentimental.

Using his own paintings of children, flowers and holiday scenes Richard Cadbury, the son of the founder of Cadbury's, introduced such designs to his chocolate boxes in the late 19th century.

Renoir's paintings have been described as "chocolate box" and have been derided by Degas and Picasso for being happy, inoffensive scenes. Constable's landscapes have also been so described.

Aelbert Cuyp's  (1660), despite being widely regarded as his best work, has been criticised as having "chocolate box blandness". Fred Swan is a modern-day proponent of chocolate box paintings as, to his detractors, was Thomas Kinkade.

The term has also been applied to sculpture. A young couple standing locked in an embrace forms the centrepiece for the St Pancras International station in central London. Entitled The Meeting Place, the sculpture is by Briton Paul Day who admitted, "Some will say it is a chocolate box sculpture".

References

Visual arts genres
Pejorative terms